Barracuda is a 1977 American horror/thriller film about a small Florida coastal town that is menaced by chemically induced and highly aggressive barracuda fish. The cast included Wayne Crawford, Jason Evers, Roberta Leighton, Cliff Emmich, William Kerwin and Bert Freed. It was directed by Harry Kerwin, with the underwater sequences handled by Wayne Crawford.

Plot
A top secret government experiment leads to fatal barracuda attacks on the beaches of a small coastal town formerly renowned for its lobster. A marine biologist (Wayne Crawford) and sheriff (William Kerwin) uncover a plot involving a mentally unstable former war-medic (Evers) pioneering research into hypoglycemia and its effects on human behavior.

Cast 
 Wayne Crawford – Mike Canfield (credited as Wayne David Crawford)
 Jason Evers – Dr. Elliot Snow
 Roberta Leighton – Liza Williams
 Cliff Emmich – Deputy Lester
 William Kerwin – Sheriff Ben Williams
 Bert Freed – Papa Jack
 Harry Kerwin – Government Agent #1
 Rick Rhodes – Government Agent #2
 Matt King – Agent Leaving
 Barbara Keegan – Maggie Snow (credited as Bobbie Ellyne Kosstrin)
 Edmund Lupinski – Boy on Beach (credited as Ed Lupinski)
 Kim Nichols – Girl on Beach
 Frank Logan – Sam
 Daniel L. Fitzgerald – Cook
 Will Knickerbocker – Bill (credited as Willis Knickerbocker)
 Ruth Miller – Edna
 Scott Avery – Toby
 Bob J. Shields – Floyd

Release

Home media
Barracuda was released on VHS by UAV Corporation on December 7, 1989. The film was released on DVD by Dark Sky Films on September 30, 2008.

Reception

Cavett Binion from Allmovie gave the film a negative review, called it "[a] muddled attempt at ecological horror". Andrew Smith from Popcorn Pictures awarded the film a score of 2/10, calling it "a cheap cash-in", and criticized the film's plot, phony special effects, and lack of focus on the film's title monsters.

References

External links
 
 
 
 

1977 films
1977 horror films
1970s horror thriller films
1970s monster movies
American horror thriller films
American monster movies
American natural horror films
1970s English-language films
Films about fish
1970s American films